David Junior may refer to:
 David Junior (horse)
 David Junior (actor)